A Bunch of Amateurs is a 2008 British comedy film directed by Andy Cadiff, and stars Burt Reynolds, Derek Jacobi, Alistair Petrie and Samantha Bond. In November 2008, the premiere in Leicester Square was attended by Elizabeth II. The screenplay was written by Nick Newman, John Ross, Ian Hislop and Jonathan Gershfield.

Plot
A washed-up Hollywood star is flown to England to play the title role in King Lear at "Stratford" believing he will be appearing onstage at the legendary RST in Stratford-upon-Avon, the birthplace of William Shakespeare. Instead he finds he has signed on with the "Stratford Players" in the Suffolk village of Stratford St John. He goes to the United Kingdom with his career deteriorating and having problems with his daughter who is an aspiring actress on the fringes of the New York theatre. The local villagers are somewhat of a motley crew and are naturally delighted to have such an - albeit unsuccessful - star playing with them.  Reynolds plays a typically selfish American with no time for manners, and displays an appalling lack of class, considering himself too big for this lowly setting.  The transition to humble actor, happy to play with the British actors takes some time, but eventually he is reconciled with his estranged daughter and realises that he is no better, in terms of talent and intelligence, than his amateur colleagues.

Cast
 Burt Reynolds as Jefferson Steele
 Samantha Bond as Dorothy Nettle
 Imelda Staunton as Mary
 Derek Jacobi as Nigel Dewberry
 Camilla Arfwedson as Amanda Blacke
 Charles Durning as Charlie Rosenberg
 Lorraine Ashbourne as Janine Jarvis
 Gemma Lawrence as Verity Nettle
 Peter Gunn as Frank Dobbins
 Tony Jayawardena as Kevin Patel
 Alistair Petrie as Rupert Twisk
 Peter Wight as Mike Bell
 Kelly Price as Lauren Bell
 Surendra Kochar as Kevin's Mum
 Kirsty More as School Girl

Release 
The film had its UK premiere at the Royal Film Performance, an event held in aid of the Film & TV Charity, on November 17, 2008 at the ODEON Leicester Square. The event was attended by Elizabeth II and the Duke of Edinburgh. The film chosen for the event was originally supposed to be Harry Potter and the Half-Blood Prince, but it was changed when the release date was pushed back.

Reception
The film was panned by critics, with criticism mostly focusing on the film's stale humour and Burt Reynolds's performance.

References

External links
 
 

2008 films
2008 comedy films
British comedy films
Films about actors
Films produced by David Parfitt
Films directed by Andy Cadiff
2000s English-language films
2000s British films